Dancers is a 1987 film directed by Herbert Ross and stars Mikhail Baryshnikov and Julie Kent.  The film received scathing reviews upon release.

Plot
The story revolves around a ballet dancer who is planning to make a film version of the ballet Giselle, and how his romance with a young woman parallels the plotline of the ballet.

Cast 
 Mikhail Baryshnikov as Tony 
 Alessandra Ferri as Francesca 
 Leslie Browne as Nadine 
 Tommy Rall as Tommy Rall
 Lynn Seymour as Muriel 
 Victor Barbee as Wade 
 Mariangela Melato as Countess
 Julie Kent as Lisa 
 Gianmarco Tognazzi as Guido

References

External links 

1987 films
1980s dance films
American dance films
Films directed by Herbert Ross
1987 romantic drama films
Films scored by Pino Donaggio
Films about ballet
Golan-Globus films
Films produced by Menahem Golan
Films produced by Yoram Globus
1980s English-language films
1980s American films